Hoslundia is a genus of flowering plant in the family Lamiaceae, first described in 1804. It contains only one known species, Hoslundia opposita. It is widespread across much of sub-Saharan Africa including Madagascar.

References

External links
 

Lamiaceae
Flora of Madagascar
Flora of Africa
Monotypic Lamiaceae genera
Taxa named by Martin Vahl